The 1990 Italian local elections were held on 6 and 7 May. The elections were held in 6,397 municipalities and 87 provinces.

The elections were won by the Christian Democracy, led by Arnaldo Forlani.

Municipal elections

Results summary

City councils of main cities

Provincial elections

References

External links

1990 elections in Italy
 
Municipal elections in Italy
May 1990 events in Europe